Seventh Swamphony is the seventh studio album by the Finnish melodic death metal band Kalmah, released on 17 June 2013. This is their first album with new keyboardist Veli-Matti Kananen. The album was recorded at Tico-Tico Studios in Kemi, Finland, and was mixed and mastered by Jens Bogren.

Track listing

Personnel

 Band
 Pekka Kokko − vocals, rhythm guitar, lead guitar on the track "The Trapper"
 Antti Kokko − lead guitar
 Veli Matti Kananen − keyboard
 Janne Kusmin − drum
 Timo Lehtinen − bass guitar

 Production
 Jens Bogren – mastering, mixing
 Kalmah – arranger, producer
 Juha Vuorma – cover art

Release history

References

External links
 The track "Windlake Tale" was released through Spinefarm Records' official SoundCloud account and can be listened to here.

Kalmah albums
2013 albums
Spinefarm Records albums